As a surname, Basher may refer to:

 Adil Basher (1926–1978), Iraqi football player and coach
 Aleem Said Ahmad Basher (born 1951), Filipino-Muslim Alim, Islamic preacher, broadcaster and lecturer
 Emma Basher (born 1992), Australia rower
 Simon Basher, an English artist, illustrator and author based in Amsterdam

See also 

 Basher (disambiguation)
 Basher (nickname)